Richard Bronaugh Barnitz (November 25, 1891 – December 22, 1960) was a lieutenant colonel in the US Army and the manager of the Los Angeles Airport from about 1930 until 1940.

Biography
He was born on November 25, 1891 in San Antonio, Texas to Wilhelmina Magill (1853-c.1919) and Harry Dagerfield Barnitz (1855-1916). He was an early proponent of having a nationwide system of municipally owned airports, and he managed the Los Angeles Airport from at least 1930 until he retired in 1940. He died on December 22, 1960 and was buried in Fort Sam Houston National Cemetery under the name "Richard Bronaugh Barnitz".

External links
Richard Bernard Barnitz at Early Aviators

References

1891 births
1960 deaths
Members of the Early Birds of Aviation
Burials at Fort Sam Houston National Cemetery